The 2000 Dura Lube/Kmart 400 was the second stock car race of the 2000 NASCAR Winston Cup Series and the 35th iteration of the event. The race was held on Sunday, February 27, 2000, in Rockingham, North Carolina at North Carolina Speedway, a  permanent D-shaped oval racetrack. The race took the scheduled 393 laps to complete. At race's end, Bobby Labonte, driving for Joe Gibbs Racing, would hold off Dale Earnhardt and win after leading the final 113 laps. This was Labonte's 13th career NASCAR Winston Cup Series win and his first of the season. To fill out the podium, Dale Earnhardt of Richard Childress Racing and Ward Burton of Bill Davis Racing would finish second and third, respectively.

Background 
North Carolina Speedway was opened as a flat, one-mile oval on October 31, 1965. In 1969, the track was extensively reconfigured to a high-banked, D-shaped oval just over one mile in length. In 1997, North Carolina Motor Speedway merged with Penske Motorsports, and was renamed North Carolina Speedway. Shortly thereafter, the infield was reconfigured, and competition on the infield road course, mostly by the SCCA, was discontinued. Currently, the track is home to the Fast Track High Performance Driving School.

Entry list 

 (R) - denotes rookie driver

 **Withdrew prior to the event.

Practice

First practice 
The first practice session was held on Friday, February 25, at 10:00 AM EST, and would last for one hour and 15 minutes.

Second and final practice 
The second and final practice session, sometimes referred to as Happy Hour, was held on Saturday, February 26.

Qualifying 
Qualifying was held on Friday, February 25, at 2:30 PM EST. Each driver would have one lap to set a fastest time; and that lap would count as their official qualifying lap. Positions 1-36 would be decided on time, while positions 37-43 would be based on provisionals. Six spots are awarded by the use of provisionals based on owner's points. The seventh is awarded to a past champion who has not otherwise qualified for the race. If no past champ needs the provisional, the next team in the owner points will be awarded a provisional.

Four drivers would fail to qualify: Ricky Craven, Scott Pruett, Dave Blaney, and Mike Bliss.

Full qualifying results

Race results

References 

2000 NASCAR Winston Cup Series
NASCAR races at Rockingham Speedway
February 2000 sports events in the United States
2000 in sports in North Carolina